Bělá pod Bezdězem is a town in Mladá Boleslav District in the Central Bohemian Region of the Czech Republic. It has about 4,700 inhabitants. The town centre is well preserved and is protected by law as urban monument zone.

Administrative parts
Villages of Bezdědice, Březinka, Hlínoviště and Vrchbělá are administrative parts of Bělá pod Bezdězem. Bezdědice forms an exclave of the municipal territory.

Etymology
The town's name is derived from the local stream Bělá and the nearby hill Bezděz. The town was first named Nový Bezděz ("New Bezděz"), but soon the name changed to Bělá.

Geography
It lies in the Jizera Table with an exception of the Bezdědice exclave, which belongs to the Ralsko Uplands. The Bělá Stream springs here and flows through the town.

History
Bělá pod Bezdězem was founded in 1304. Until 1398 it was a royal town. In the 16th and early 17th centuries, it was owned by the Berka of Dubá family. After their properties were confiscated after the Battle of White Mountain, Bělá pod Bezdězem was purchased by Albrecht von Wallenstein in 1622. After his death in 1634, it was acquired by Count Caretto-Millesimo. He sold the town to the Waldstein family in 1678, and they owned it until 1848.

Demographics

Sights

In 1337, building of the town walls was finished. Their fragments have been preserved to this day. Bělá Castle was built on the place of a former fortress in 1582–1615. Today it serves as a museum.

The former Augustinian convent was built in 1345. Today, there are flats in the convent buildings. The Baroque Church of St. Wenceslaus was built next to the monastery in 1708–1712.

The current town hall was built in 1613. In 1852, second floor was added.

Notable people
Václav Trégl (1902–1979), actor
Luděk Pachman (1924–2003), Czech-German chess grandmaster

Twin towns – sister cities

Bělá pod Bezdězem is twinned with:
 Groß-Bieberau, Germany
 Svätý Jur, Slovakia

References

External links

Cities and towns in the Czech Republic
Populated places in Mladá Boleslav District